John M. Potter (1924–1993) was a member of the Wisconsin State Senate.

Biography
Potter was born on August 16, 1924 in Wisconsin Rapids, Wisconsin. He attended school in Nekoosa, Wisconsin and De Pere, Wisconsin, as well as the University of Michigan and what is now the University of Wisconsin-Madison. Potter lived in Port Edwards, Wisconsin and died  September 23, 1993.

Career
Potter was a member of the Senate from the 24th District from 1961 to 1964. He succeeded William Walter Clark and was succeeded by William C. Hansen. From 1950 to 1957, he had been District Attorney of Wood County, Wisconsin. Additionally, he was a delegate to the 1964 Republican National Convention.

References

External links
 The Political Graveyard

People from Wisconsin Rapids, Wisconsin
People from Nekoosa, Wisconsin
Republican Party Wisconsin state senators
District attorneys in Wisconsin
University of Michigan alumni
University of Wisconsin–Madison alumni
1924 births
1993 deaths
20th-century American lawyers
20th-century American politicians